Dortmund Knappschaftskrankenhaus is a railway station in the Dortmund district of Brackel in the German state of North Rhine-Westphalia near the Knappschaftskrankenhaus (literally "miners' hospital"). It is classified by Deutsche Bahn as a category 6 station. It was opened on 26 May 1963 on the Welver–Sterkrade railway completed between Welver and the old Dortmund Süd (south) station by the Royal Westphalian Railway Company on 15 May 1876 and electrified on 25 May 1984.

It is served by Rhine-Ruhr S-Bahn line S 4 at 30-minute intervals (15-minute intervals in the peak between Dortmund-Lütgendortmund and ).

References 

S4 (Rhine-Ruhr S-Bahn)
Rhine-Ruhr S-Bahn stations
Railway stations in Dortmund
Railway stations in Germany opened in 1963
1963 establishments in West Germany